A startup winding, also known as the auxiliary winding, is used to create the torque needed to start a single phase induction motor.

This winding creates the rotating magnetic field in this type of motor by changing the relationship of the current in relation to the voltage.

Classical mechanics